An inkwell is a small jar or container, often made of glass, porcelain, silver, brass, or pewter, used for holding ink in a place convenient for the person who is writing. The artist or writer dips the brush, quill, or dip pen into the inkwell as needed or uses the inkwell as the source for filling the reservoir of a fountain pen. An inkwell usually has a lid to prevent contamination, evaporation, accidental spillage, and excessive exposure to air. A type known as the travelling inkwell was fitted with a secure, screw lid so a traveller could carry a supply of ink in their luggage without the risk of leakage.

Origins
The inkwell's origins may be traced back to Ancient Egypt where scribes would write on papyrus.  Knowledge of hieroglyphs was at the time highly restricted.  Only scribes knew the full array of hieroglyphs and would write on the behalf of their employers, usually the pharaoh.  After Rome invaded Egypt, inkwells became more popular in Italy as a larger percentage of the population were capable of writing.

Inkwells gradually fell out of use in the early part of 20th century as the reservoir fountain pen (which needs to be filled only occasionally) replaced the dip pen, which needed to be dipped in ink after writing a few lines. Old school desks had round holes for inkwells.

Gallery

Bibliography
The Collector's World of Inkwells, Jean & Franklin Hunting, Schiffer Publishing Ltd 
The Write Stuff  Inkwells Pens & Desk Accessories, Ray & Bevy Jaegers, Krause Publications 
McGraw's Book of Antique Inkwells Volume 1, Vincent D McGraw, published privately 1972
Edwardian Shopping 1898-1913 selection facsimile, Army & Navy Stores, David  & Charles 
Pens & Writing Equipment, Jim Marshall, Miller's 
English Silver Hallmarks, Judith Bannister, W Foulsham & Co Ltd 
Handbook of Pottery & Porcelain Marks, J P Cushion, Faber & Faber Ltd 
Walter's Inkwells of 1885 Book 1, Leo G Walter, published privately 1968
Inkbottles & Inkwells, William E Covill Jnr, William S Sullwold 1971
Inkstands & Inkwells A Collector's Guide, Betty & Ted Rivera, Crown Publishers Inc,
Inkwells Identification & Values Book 1,Veldon Badders, Schroeder Publishing Inc, 
Inkwells Identification & Values Book II, Veldon Badders, Schroeder Publishing Inc, 
Western Writing Implements, Michael Finlay, Plains Books 
Writing Antiques, George Mell, Shire Publications Ltd 
Writing Implements & Accessories, Joyce Irene Whalley, David & Charles 
Yesterday's Shopping 1907 facsimile, Army & Navy Stores, David & Charles 
The Story of Writing, Donald Jackson, Studio Vista 
The Enormous File, A Social History of the Office, Alan Delgado, John Murray Doulton Ink Wares, Colin Roberts, BEE Publications 
De Vito, C., Medeghini, L., Mignardi, S., Coletti, F., & Contino, A. (2017). (rome, italy): Production technology. Journal of the European Ceramic Society'', 37(4), 1779–1788. 10.1016/j.jeurceramsoc.2016.11.044

See also
 Calligraphy

References

Writing implements
Pens
Visual arts materials
Decorative arts